Route 940 is a  long north to south secondary highway in the southeastern portion of New Brunswick, Canada.

Route description
Most of the route is in Westmorland County.

The route's northern terminus is in Shemogue at Route 15 and Route 950. It travels southwest through a mostly treed area where it passes Square Lake.  The route passes through Anderson Settlement, Centre Village then turns south in Midgic.  The route again turns southwest passing through Ward then crosses the Tantramar River, entering Upper Sackville.  The route passes Silver Lake then enters Middle Sackville then crosses Route 1 Exit 504 as it enters Sackville.  The route passes Sackville Waterfowl Park on the Tantramar Marsh then the Tantramar Civic Centre ending at Route 106.

History

See also

References

940
940